Dalia Henry (born 14 June 1965) is a Cuban former basketball player who competed in the 1992 Summer Olympics, in the 1996 Summer Olympics, and in the 2000 Summer Olympics. She was born in Havana.

References

1965 births
Living people
Basketball players from Havana
Cuban women's basketball players
Olympic basketball players of Cuba
Basketball players at the 1992 Summer Olympics
Basketball players at the 1996 Summer Olympics
Basketball players at the 2000 Summer Olympics